Pradeep Seth is an Indian virologist who injected himself in 2003 with a potential vaccine he had developed for HIV. He has been working in the field of virology since 1968 and is an elected fellow of the National Academy of Medical Sciences,

He did his MBBS and Masters (MD) in Microbiology from AIIMS in 1970 and then taught at the same institute till 2005. He holds 4 Indian Patent and 4 International Patent in the field of Virology. In 1986, he was awarded the Shanti Swarup Bhatnagar Prize for his contribution in Medical Sciences.

References

External links
 Doctor Pradeep Seth Official Site

Indian virologists
Living people
Academic staff of the All India Institute of Medical Sciences, New Delhi
Fellows of the National Academy of Medical Sciences
Year of birth missing (living people)
Recipients of the Shanti Swarup Bhatnagar Award in Medical Science